Klassiska mästerverk is the fourth compilation album from Swedish pop rock musician Magnus Uggla. It was released in 2002.

Track listing
CD one
 "Kung för en dag" - 3:18
 "Vittring" - 3:08
 "Jag mår illa" - 4:08
 "Varning på stan" - 4:40
 "Fula gubbar" - 4:17
 "Nitar & läder" - 4:03
 "Staffans matematik" - 4:53
 "Passionsfrukt" - 3:50
 "Dansar aldrig nykter" - 3:38
 "Hotta brudar" - 3:08
 "IQ" - 3:31
 "Mitt decennium" - 4:33
 "Johnny the Rucker" - 4:49
 "Pom Pom" - 3:37
 "Skandal bjotis" - 4:06
 "Jånni Balle" - 3:11
 "Centrumhets" - 4:03
 "Jag skiter" - 3:23
 "Stockholms heta nätter" - 3:37
 "Vi ska till VM" - 3:50

CD two
 "4 sekunder" - 4:05
 "Hallå" - 3:08
 "Baby Boom" - 5:28
 "Astrologen" - 5:09
 "Trendit, trendit" - 3:51
 "Hand i hand" - 4:38
 "Mälarö kyrka" - 3:04
 "Trubaduren" - 5:13
 "Joey Killer" - 4:29
 "Victoria" - 4:16
 "Jag vill" - 3:44
 "Visa" - 3:41
 "Raggarna" - 3:12
 "Ska vi gå hem till dig" - 5:08
 "Ge livet en chans" - 3:02
 "Sommartid" - 4:43
 "Morsan e’ okej" - 3:22
 "Ja just du ska va gla" - 4:30
 "1:a gången" - 3:15

Charts

Weekly charts

Year-end charts

Certifications

References 

2002 compilation albums
Magnus Uggla compilation albums
Swedish-language compilation albums